Brendan H. Macken (21 January 1923 – 12 March 2020) was a Canadian National tennis champion and Davis Cup player.

Originally from Montreal, Macken won the precursor to today's Roger Cups, the 1950 Canadian National championship, in singles, by defeating Henri Rochon in the final, 6-0, 6-0, 6-3.  Despite this convincing scoreline, it was his only Canadian championship singles title.  He also won the doubles crown twice - in 1946 with his brother Jim and in 1951 partnering Lorne Main.

Macken competed in nine consecutive United States National championships in singles, from 1945 through 1953.  His best result was winning two matches to reach the third round in 1952.  He also reached the last 32 in 1945 with a depleted field, which saw him as the No. 14 seed.  Macken once competed in the main draw singles at Wimbledon, losing his only match in four sets to Kurt Nielsen.

In Davis Cup, Macken played in 10 ties for Canada over 9 years, beginning in 1946.  Canada's best result with Macken on board was defeating Mexico in 1952 to reach the America Zone final, where they lost to the U.S. 1-4.  Macken won both of his singles matches against Mexico as Canada swept the tie, 5 matches to nil.  He then took the only match off the Americans, beating Robert Perry in a dead fifth rubber.  Macken's career match win–loss record was 6 and 8 in singles and 1 and 5 in doubles.

References

External links

Rogers Cup 2010 online media guide

1923 births
2020 deaths
Anglophone Quebec people
Canadian male tennis players
Tennis players from Montreal
20th-century Canadian people
21st-century Canadian people